Craig Ward may refer to:

Craig Ward, British singer in The Voice UK (series 6)
Craig Ward (musician) in Deus (band), Belgian band